William James Edwards Lee III (born July 23, 1928) is an American musician. He is the father of Spike Lee and Joie Lee. He has composed original music for many of his son's films, including She's Gotta Have It (1986), School Daze (1988), Do the Right Thing (1989) and Mo' Better Blues (1990). Lee was involved in many releases from the Strata-East jazz record label, including directing the 1980 album The New York Bass Violin Choir.

Personal life
Lee was born in Snow Hill, Alabama, the son of Alberta Grace (Edwards), a concert pianist, and Arnold Wadsworth Lee, a musician. In 1951, he graduated from Morehouse College in Atlanta, Georgia. He married his college sweetheart who was enrolled at a neighboring college, Jacqueline (Jackie) Shelton, a 1954 Spelman College graduate. With his first wife, Jackie, he had four children; film director Spike Lee (born 1957), still photographer David Lee (born 1961), actress Joie Lee (born 1962), and filmmaker Cinqué Lee (born 1966). With his second wife, Susan, he has one son, Arnold Lee, who plays alto saxophone.

Lee was arrested on October 25, 1991 in the Fort Greene section of Brooklyn for carrying a small bag of heroin during a police drug sweep of a park near his home. Lee would later say of his arrest, "I'm glad I was arrested, It woke me up."

Relationship with Spike Lee
Though Bill Lee scored his son's first four movies, they had a falling out shortly after the arrest on drug charges. "I don't have anything to do with Spike now," Lee told New York Newsday in 1994. "We haven't talked for two years."

Bill Lee has said their problems started with his son's intolerance of his second marriage. The family feud began in 1976, when Spike Lee's mother Jacquelyn died of cancer and Susan Kaplan moved in with Bill. Spike has been quoted as saying, "my mother wasn't even cold in her grave." Bad feelings intensified with Jungle Fever, Spike Lee's film on interracial romantic relationships, as Bill Lee's second marriage was to a white woman.

Career
Lee has played the bass for many artists including Chris Anderson, Cat Stevens, Harry Belafonte, Chad Mitchell Trio, Gordon Lightfoot, Aretha Franklin, Odetta, Simon and Garfunkel, Ian & Sylvia, Tom Rush, Burt Bacharach, Peter, Paul and Mary, Arlo Guthrie, Tom Paxton, Carolyn Hester, John Lee Hooker, Josh White, Duke Ellington, Malvina Reynolds, Eric Bibb, The Clancy Brothers and Bob Dylan.  On the original release of Dylan's classic song "It's All Over Now, Baby Blue," Lee, on bass guitar, is the only musician performing other than Dylan himself. On Gordon Lightfoot's song Oh, Linda (recorded 1964), Lee is also the only musician other than Lightfoot's voice.

Film music
Music director and performer on the song "Nola", She's Gotta Have It, Island, 1986.
Music conductor of Natural Spiritual Orchestra, School Daze, Columbia, 1988.
Music conductor of Natural Spiritual Orchestra, Do the Right Thing, Universal, 1989.
Music director, Mo' Better Blues, Universal, 1990.
Composer of score for the short film Joe's Bed-Stuy Barbershop: We Cut Heads.

Filmography
Sonny Darling, She's Gotta Have It, Island, 1986.
Bassist in the Phyllis Hyman Quartet, School Daze, Columbia, 1988.
Father of the Bride, Mo' Better Blues, Universal, 1990.

Discography
John Lee Hooker: The Folk Lore of John Lee Hooker (Vee-Jay, 1961)
Ray Bryant: Con Alma (Columbia, 1960); Dancing the Big Twist (Columbia, 1961)
Frank Strozier: March of the Siamese Children (Jazzland, 1962)
Aretha Franklin: Aretha: With The Ray Bryant Combo (1961), The Tender, the Moving, the Swinging Aretha Franklin (1962)
Chris Anderson: My Romance (Vee-Jay, 1960 [1983]), Inverted Image (Jazzland, 1961) 
Judy Collins: Golden Apples of the Sun (1962), Fifth Album (1965), Whales & Nightingales (1970)
The Descendants of Mike and Phoebe: A Spirit Speaks (Strata-East)
The Brass Company: Colors (Strata East)
Stanley Cowell: Regeneration (Strata-East, 1976)
Simon & Garfunkel: Wednesday Morning, 3 A.M. (1964)
Richard Davis: The Philosophy of the Spiritual (Cobblestone, 1971), Fancy Free (Galaxy, 1977) and Harvest (Muse, 1977 [1979])
The Warm Voice of Billy "C": Where have you been Billy Boy (Strata East)
José Feliciano: The Voice and Guitar of José Feliciano (1965)
John Handy: No Coast Jazz (Roulette, 1960)
Clifford Jordan: Glass Bead Games (Strata-East, 1974); The Adventurer (Muse, 1978)
Tom Rush: Tom Rush (1965), Take a Little Walk with Me (1966) 
Chuck Loeb and Andy LaVerne: Magic Fingers (DMP, 1989)
Peter, Paul & Mary: Album (Warner Bros.)
Harold Mabern: A Few Miles from Memphis (Prestige), Rakin' and Scrapin' (Prestige)
The New York Bass Violin Choir - The New York Bass Violin Choir (Strata-East)
Pat Martino: Starbright (Warner Bros., 1976)
Ian and Sylvia: First Ian & Sylvia Album
Johnny Griffin: Change of Pace (Riverside, 1961)
Gordon Lightfoot: Lightfoot! (United Artists, 1966)
Michael Bloomfield: From His Head to His Heart to His Hands (Sony Legacy, 2014) Bill plays on "I'm a County Boy", "Judge, Judge", and "Hammond's Rag" from a 1964 audition for John Hammond at Columbia Records.

References

External links

 

1928 births
20th-century American bass guitarists
20th-century American conductors (music)
20th-century double-bassists
20th-century jazz composers
21st-century American bass guitarists
21st-century American conductors (music)
21st-century double-bassists
21st-century jazz composers
African-American conductors (music)
African-American jazz composers
African-American jazz musicians
African-American male actors
American jazz bass guitarists
American jazz double-bassists
Male double-bassists
American male bass guitarists
American male conductors (music)
American session musicians
Jazz musicians from Alabama
Lee family (show business)
Living people
American male jazz composers
American jazz composers
Morehouse College alumni
People from Wilcox County, Alabama
20th-century American male musicians
21st-century American male musicians
People from Fort Greene, Brooklyn
African-American guitarists
Jazz musicians from New York (state)
20th-century African-American musicians
21st-century African-American musicians